Dina Aliaksandraŭna Agisheva (born April 17, 2005) is a Belarusian individual rhythmic gymnast. She is the 2020 Junior European champion with Rope.

References

External links 
 

Living people
2005 births
Belarusian rhythmic gymnasts
Sportspeople from Rostov-on-Don
21st-century Belarusian women